Refractory anemia with excess of blasts (RAEB) is a type of myelodysplastic syndrome with a marrow blast percentage of 5% to 19%.

In MeSH, "Smoldering leukemia" is classified under RAEB.

References

External links 
 Smoldering leukemia entry in the public domain NCI Dictionary of Cancer Terms

Myeloid neoplasia